The brown crake (Zapornia akool), or brown bush-hen, is a waterbird in the rail and crake family (Rallidae) found in South Asia. The species name, akool, is of uncertain origin.  It may come from Hindu mythology, or it may be a derivation of the Sinhalese word kukkula, which is used for both moorhen and watercock.

References

brown crake
Birds of China
Birds of Hong Kong
Birds of South Asia
Birds of Vietnam
brown crake